Bobby Richardson (born November 30, 1992) is a former American football defensive end. He was signed by the New Orleans Saints as an undrafted free agent in 2015. He played college football at Indiana.

Professional career

New Orleans Saints
Richardson signed with the New Orleans Saints as an undrafted rookie free agent in 2015. Richardson started 2015 as a starting defensive end for the Saints. In the Saints' Week 15 matchup against the Jacksonville Jaguars, Richardson recorded his first career interception. Saints cornerback Delvin Breaux tipped a ball thrown by Jaguar quarterback Blake Bortles and it flew through the air, allowing Richardson to catch it. On September 3, 2016, he was waived by the Saints. He was then signed to the Saints' practice squad. On September 14, 2016, he was released from their practice squad.

Washington Redskins
On September 19, 2016, Richardson was signed to the Washington Redskins' practice squad. He was released on October 19, 2016.

Kansas City Chiefs
Richardson was signed to the Kansas City Chiefs practice squad on October 26, 2016. He was released on November 9, 2016.

Denver Broncos
On February 24, 2017, Richardson signed with the Broncos. On May 3, 2017, Richardson was waived by the Broncos.

New York Giants
On August 15, 2017, Richardson signed with the New York Giants. He was waived on September 2, 2017.

Hamilton Tiger-Cats
Richardson signed with the Hamilton Tiger-Cats of the Canadian Football League on April 20, 2018. He re-signed with the team on December 6, 2018, but retired on May 6, 2019.

Tampa Bay Vipers
In October 2019, Richardson was among the Tampa Bay Vipers' open-round choices in the 2020 XFL Draft. He had his contract terminated when the league suspended operations on April 10, 2020.

References

External links
New Orleans Saints bio
Indiana Hoosiers bio

1992 births
Living people
Players of American football from Tampa, Florida
Players of Canadian football from Tampa, Florida
American football defensive ends
American football defensive tackles
Indiana Hoosiers football players
New Orleans Saints players
Washington Redskins players
Kansas City Chiefs players
Denver Broncos players
New York Giants players
Hamilton Tiger-Cats players
Tampa Bay Vipers players
Canadian football defensive linemen
Henry B. Plant High School alumni